Creeting St Peter is a village and civil parish in the Mid Suffolk district of Suffolk in eastern England. Located to the north of the A14 road between Stowmarket and Needham Market, in 2005 its population was 260. increasing to 275 at the 2011 Census.

References

External links

Villages in Suffolk
Civil parishes in Suffolk
Mid Suffolk District